Hossein-Ali Haji-Deligani is an Iranian conservative politician who represents Shahin Shahr and Meymeh County in the Parliament of Iran. He is a member of Front of Islamic Revolution Stability. In the 2017 attack on Iranian Parliament, the assailants entered his office, killing the secretary.

References

1962 births
Living people
Members of the 9th Islamic Consultative Assembly
Members of the 10th Islamic Consultative Assembly
Front of Islamic Revolution Stability politicians
Islamic Revolutionary Guard Corps personnel of the Iran–Iraq War